Patrick O'Sullivan Hehir was an Australian cycling champion. He participated in the 1912 UCI Track Cycling World Championships at the Newark Velodrome. Hehir won the American Derby event in 1912. He also won the Six Days of Buffalo in 1913 with Peter Drobach. In 1910, Frank L. Kramer beat Hehir in the one-mile open professional event.

References

Australian male cyclists
Australian track cyclists
Place of birth missing
Year of birth missing
Year of death missing